A number of ships of the Royal Navy were named Deal Castle, after the castle of the same name.

, a sixth rate
, a sixth rate
, a fourth rate
, a sixth rate
, a sixth rate

Royal Navy ship names